General Sir Thomas Reed,  (1796 – 24 July 1883) was a British Army officer and the 20th General Officer Commanding, Ceylon.

He was born in Dublin, the son of Thomas Reed of Dublin, by Eliza, daughter of Colonel Sir F. J. Buchanan.

He entered the army as a cornet in the 12th Light Dragoons in 1813, was promoted lieutenant in 1815, and was with the regiment at the Battle of Waterloo. In 1834 he was made lieutenant-colonel of the 62nd Foot, a position he held for eighteen years. He was made brevet-colonel in 1841 and the following year aide-de-camp to the queen. Two years afterwards he was made a CB

During the First Sikh War his regiment formed part of the force which held Ferozepore under Sir John Hunter Littler. At the Battle of Ferozeshah in 1845 Reed commanded a brigade (including his own regiment) of Littler's division and was ordered to attack the strongest part of the Sikh entrenchments where there was a large number of heavy guns served with grape and canister. The attack was unsuccessful, with heavy losses, and Reed himself was slightly wounded.

In 1852 he gave up the command of the 62nd and went on half-pay, employed as colonel on the staff at Birmingham. Promoted major-general in 1854, he went out the following year as General Officer Commanding the troops in Ceylon until 1856, when he was transferred to a division of the Madras army and soon afterwards to the command of the troops in the Punjab.

When the Indian Mutiny broke out in 1857 he became provisional commander-in-chief on the death of General Anson from cholera, as the senior officer in the Bengal presidency, until Sir Patrick Grant arrived. On the death of Sir Henry Barnard, Reed assumed command of the field force but the exertions and anxieties of that position were too much for him. He was obliged to give up the responsibility and thereafter saw no further service in the field.

In 1858 he was made colonel of the 44th (East Essex) Regiment of Foot, transferring in 1881 to be Colonel of the 1st Battalion, Essex Regiment, which was formed when the 44th Regiment was amalgamated in that year with the 56th Foot. He was promoted Lieutenant-General in 1860 and General in 1868.

In 1877 he was placed on the retired list, having had been made K.C.B. in 1865 and G.C.B. in 1875. He died at Romsey, Hampshire on 24 July 1883. In 1835 he had married Elizabeth Jane, daughter of John Clayton of Enfield Old Park, Middlesex.

References

Attribution:

External links

1796 births
1883 deaths
12th Royal Lancers officers
44th Regiment of Foot officers
King's Shropshire Light Infantry officers
Wiltshire Regiment officers
British Army personnel of the Napoleonic Wars
British military personnel of the First Anglo-Sikh War
British military personnel of the Indian Rebellion of 1857
British Army generals
General Officers Commanding, Ceylon
Knights Grand Cross of the Order of the Bath
Sri Lankan people of Irish descent
People from British Ceylon